Phlaocyon yatkolai is an extinct species of canid mammal known from the early Hemingfordian Runningwater Formation, Box Butte County, Nebraska
(paleocoordinates ).

P. yatkolai, named after the collector late Daniel Yatkola, is known from a right dentary with teeth.  It is a large species of Phlaocyon and it displays several derived characters in its dentition.  These characters are, however, slightly less derived than in its sister taxon P. mariae.  Wang et al. argued that these two species display a tendency towards hypercarnivorous dentition, in contrast to the hypocarnivorous dentition found in the other members of the genus.

References

Notes

Sources

 

Borophagines
Miocene canids
Taxa named by Xiaoming Wang
Taxa named by Richard H. Tedford